The 1939 Colorado A&M Aggies football team was an American football team that represented Colorado A&M (now known as Colorado State University) in the Mountain States Conference (MSC) during the 1939 college football season.  In their 29th season under head coach Harry W. Hughes, the Aggies compiled a 2–7 record (2–4 against MSC opponents), finished sixth in the MSC, and were outscored by a total of 128 to 89.

Schedule

References

Colorado AandM
Colorado State Rams football seasons
Colorado AandM Aggies football